Shahrdari Bandar Abbas (Shiherdari-ye Bendâr Obas) is an Iranian football club based in Bandar Abbas, Iran. They currently compete in Iran Football's 2nd Division.

History

Establishment
At the end of the 2005–06 season Esteghlal Kish, a team based on the island of Kish were dissolved and their licence was purchased by Shahrdari Bandar Abbas, allowing them to compete in the Azadegan League for the 2006–07 season where they were successful and nearly managed to get promotion to the Iran Pro League. Rah Ahan F.C. prevented their promotion beating them 5–0 on aggregate with the second match being abandoned due to crowd trouble meaning a 3–0 loss for Shahrdari.

Azadegan League
In 2012, Shahrdari missed out on promotion by finishing third, one spot behind the last promotion spot. In 2013, Shahrdari had a disappointing season as they finished an average 8th place. The following year they again had an average season finishing 6th.

2nd Division
In the 2014–15 Azadegan League season, Shahrdari finished 11th in Group B and was relegated to the 2nd Division.

Club managers

Managerial history

Season-by-season
The table below chronicles the achievements of Shahrdari Bandar Abbas in various competitions since 2006.

References

External links
  Players and Results
  Shahrdari Bandar Abbas fan site

Football clubs in Iran
Association football clubs established in 2006
Hormozgan Province
2006 establishments in Iran